Brian Giorgis (born May 29, 1955) is a retired head coach of the Marist Red Foxes women's basketball program. Giorgis completed his twenty-first season at the helm as head coach in 2023. His 250th career win at Marist, which came in March 2012, coincided with his players notching the Red Foxes' 7th Metro Atlantic Athletic Conference (MAAC) crown, and their eighth conference crown since 2004.

In 2007, Giorgis coached the Red Foxes through two NCAA Tournament victories, thus becoming the first-ever MAAC program to appear in the women's Round of 16.

On February 28, 2022, Giorgis announced his retirement, effective after the 2022–23 season. His top assistant Erin Doughty, who played under him at Marist, was designated as his successor.

Career background
Giorgis graduated from SUNY Cortland with a bachelor's degree in health education in 1977, and earned a master's degree from Virginia Tech in 1982.

Giorgis had much success with the Marist women's program, having spent his entire Division I coaching career at Marist.

Before his time at Marist, Giorgis built a powerhouse for 19 seasons coaching high-school girls' basketball, as well as other sports, and as a teacher of biology and health at Our Lady of Lourdes High School in Poughkeepsie, NY, before he was hired as head coach at nearby Marist College.

Giorgis led the Lourdes girls' basketball team to four consecutive state championships during his tenure as coach, and he compiled a 451–44 record. He is the only coach in New York scholastic sports history to bring teams in four different sports to the state Final Four, as he also led Lourdes' baseball, softball and volleyball teams.

Head coaching record

References

External links
 Coach Profile

1955 births
Living people
High school basketball coaches in the United States
Marist Red Foxes women's basketball coaches
State University of New York at Cortland alumni
American women's basketball coaches